Ana Amparo Peña Rodriguez, popularly known as "Nany Peña" or just "Nany", is a comedian, actress, and media personality from the Dominican Republic. She has been recently named by her fans and multiple media outlets as the Dominican "Queen of Comedy".

Career 

Peña began her television career in 1985 with Cecilia Garcia in Cecilia En Facetas when the producer and art director of the show, 'Guillermo Cordero, reached out to hire her as a production assistant. Five years later, she joined the cast of El Gordo de La Semana and Punto Final, hosted by Freddy Beras Goico and televised through Color Vision. The entire cast became known as the best comedy team or Dream Team of Dominican television. The cast including her, consisted of: Felipe Polanco, Cuquin Victoria, Kenny Grullón, Margaro, and Maria Rosa Almanzar. During most comedy sketches, they were all rarely able to stifle their laughter. Sometimes, Beras-Goico's laughter would become so contagious, that soon the entire cast and crew would start shaking in hysterical attempts to control their own laughter. She remained in both primetime shows until 1999.

Between 1991 and 2002, she remained one of the most sought out female actors to star in numerous TV and Radio commercials; becoming a brand ambassador for distinguished brands such as Leche Milex, Codetel currently known as Claro, Cafe Santo Domingo, Vimenca & Western Union.

In 1994 she received the Comedian of the Year award from the Soberano Awards, formerly known as Premios Casandra.

In 2001, she created and produced her own TV and radio show named El Show de Nany Peña televised via Antena Latina. In 2004, she left the Dominican Republic with her husband and daughter to live in the United States.

Radio
El Show de Nany Peña (2001-2003)

Television
Cecilia en Facetas (1985-1990)
Punto Final (1990-1999)
El Gordo de La Semana (1990-1999)
El Patio de Medrano (1998-2000)
TVHumor.com(1999-2000)
Con Música Te Lo Cuento (2000-2002)
El Pasarrato (2001)
El Show de Nany Peña (2001-2003)
La Escuelota (2020)

Theatre / Live Shows
 Cosas de Papá y Mamá (1995?)
 La Sirvienta es Peligrosa (1996)
 Papolino (1998)
 Nany P y Kenny G en Gira (1993-1996)
 La Escuelota en Vivo (2018-2019)

Filmography
Nueba Yol III: Bajo la Nueva Ley (1997)

Viral on TikTok 
In 2020, Nany Peña's peculiar voice and comedy style captivated new generations through TikTok. There are currently more than 12 million users uploading videos with the hashtag #NanyPeña, where young and long-time admirers imitate the comedian and share their videos daily on the platform all over the world. Going viral has been a complete surprise, according to Peña.

YouTube channel 
In April 2020, the comedian relaunched her YouTube channel, where she shares memories, original anecdotes from comedy sketches, as well as vlogs and other types of content where she claims will be publishing in the coming months.

References 

Dominica women
Dominican Republic actresses
1956 births
Living people